Horse Creek is a stream in the U.S. state of Tennessee. It is a tributary of the Tennessee River.

According to tradition, Horse Creek once was the hideout of horse thieves, hence the name.

Tributaries of Horse Creek include Holland Creek.

References

Rivers of Hardin County, Tennessee
Rivers of Wayne County, Tennessee
Rivers of Tennessee